Mass Rapid Transit Authority of Thailand or MRTA is a state enterprise under the Ministry of Transport of Thailand. It is responsible the operation of rapid transit systems in the Bangkok Metropolitan Region and including other provinces as defined by the royal decree. The MRTA was founded in 1992 and underwent restructuring in 2000.  The MRTA oversees the operation of the BTS outside Bangkok areas and MRT, which consists of the operational Blue Line and Purple Line. Other systems, including the Airport Rail Link, are owned and operated by other agencies.

History 
The Mass Rapid Transit Authority of Thailand was established in 1992 under the name Metropolitan Rapid Transit Authority, under the Royal Decree Establishment of the Metropolitan Rapid Transit Authority B.E. 2535, with the objective of organizing mass transportation systems in Bangkok and its vicinity by electric train.

On 1 December 2000, under the Mass Rapid Transit Authority of Thailand Act B.E. 2543, the name was changed to Mass Rapid Transit Authority of Thailand. 

Under the act, the MRTA has the authority to designate "safe zones" to protect subway tunnels and underground structures and oversee the metro system as a whole. In addition, the MRTA is able to find income other than passenger fares and can develop real estate as necessary for the benefit of the electric train service and has the authority to operate the electric train business. The transit system may expand to other provinces as the royal decree authorizes.

See also 
 Mass Rapid Transit Master Plan in Bangkok Metropolitan Region

References 

State enterprises of Thailand
Rapid transit in Bangkok
Government railway authorities
1992 establishments in Thailand